is a Japanese politician of the Liberal Democratic Party, a member of the House of Representatives in the Diet (national legislature). A native of Shinjuku, Tokyo and dropout of Waseda University, he was elected to the House of Representatives for the first time in 2005.

References

External links 
  in Japanese.

1950 births
Living people
People from Shinjuku
Waseda University alumni
Koizumi Children
Members of the House of Representatives (Japan)
Liberal Democratic Party (Japan) politicians